M*A*S*H (an acronym for Mobile Army Surgical Hospital) is an American war comedy-drama television series that aired on CBS from September 17, 1972 to February 28, 1983. It was developed by Larry Gelbart as the first original spin-off series adapted from the 1970 feature film M*A*S*H, which, in turn, was based on Richard Hooker's 1968 novel MASH: A Novel About Three Army Doctors. The series, which was produced with 20th Century Fox Television for CBS, follows a team of doctors and support staff stationed at the "4077th Mobile Army Surgical Hospital" in Uijeongbu, South Korea, during the Korean War (1950–53).

The ensemble cast originally featured Alan Alda and Wayne Rogers as surgeons Benjamin "Hawkeye" Pierce and "Trapper" John McIntyre, the protagonists of the show, joined by Larry Linville as surgeon Frank Burns, Loretta Swit as head nurse Margaret "Hot Lips" Houlihan, McLean Stevenson as company commander Henry Blake, Gary Burghoff as company clerk Walter "Radar" O'Reilly, Jamie Farr as orderly Maxwell Klinger, and William Christopher as the chaplain, Father John Mulcahy.  Over the run of the show, several members of the main cast were replaced: Wayne Rogers was replaced by Mike Farrell as B. J. Hunnicutt, McLean Stevenson was replaced by Harry Morgan as Sherman Potter, Larry Linville was replaced by David Ogden Stiers as Charles Emerson Winchester III, and when Gary Burghoff left the show, the Maxwell Klinger character moved into the company clerk role. Longtime supporting cast members included Kellye Nakahara, Jeff Maxwell, Allan Arbus, and Edward Winter.

The series varied in style and tone – including broad comedy and tragic drama – which can be attributed to fluctuating writing staff over the life of the show, and the variety of sources contributing to the stories, such as actor Alan Alda and surgeons who served in the Korean War. The show's title sequence features an instrumental version of "Suicide Is Painless", the original film's theme song.

The show was created after an attempt to film the original book's sequel, M*A*S*H Goes to Maine, failed. The television series is the best-known of the M*A*S*H works, and one of the highest-rated shows in U.S. television history. Its final episode, "Goodbye, Farewell and Amen", was the most-watched television broadcast in American history from 1983 until 2010, and remains both the most-watched finale of any television series and the most-watched episode of a scripted series.

Premise 
M*A*S*H aired weekly on CBS, with most episodes being a half-hour in length. The series is usually categorized as a situation comedy, though it has also been described as a "dark comedy" or a "dramedy" because of the often dramatic subject matter.

The show is an ensemble piece revolving around key personnel in a United States Army Mobile Army Surgical Hospital (MASH) in the Korean War (1950–53). The "4077th MASH" was one of several surgical units in Korea. The asterisks in the name are not part of military nomenclature and were creatively introduced in the novel and used in only the posters for the movie version, not the actual movie.

Early seasons aired on network prime time while the Vietnam War was still ongoing; the show was forced to walk the fine line of commenting on that war while at the same time not seeming to protest against it. The show's discourse, under the cover of comedy, often questioned, mocked, and grappled with America's role in the Cold War.

Episodes were both plot- and character-driven, with several narrated by one of the show's characters as the contents of a letter home. The show's tone could move from silly to sobering from one episode to the next, with dramatic tension often occurring between the unwilling civilian draftees of 4077th – Hawkeye, Trapper John, and B.J. Hunnicutt, for example – and the "regular Army" characters, such as Margaret Houlihan and Colonel Potter, who enlisted voluntarily. Other characters, such as Lt. Col. Blake, Maj. Winchester, and Cpl. Klinger, help demonstrate various American civilian attitudes toward Army life, while guest characters played by such actors as Eldon Quick, Herb Voland, Mary Wickes, and Tim O'Connor also help further the show's discussion of America's place as Cold War participant and peace maker.

Characters

Main cast

Through changes of personnel M*A*S*H maintained a relatively constant ensemble cast, with four characters – Hawkeye, Father Mulcahy, Margaret Houlihan, and Maxwell Klinger – on the show for all 11 seasons. Several other main characters departed or joined the program during its run, and numerous guest actors and recurring characters were used. The writers found creating so many names difficult, and used names from elsewhere; for example, characters on the seventh season were named after the 1978 Los Angeles Dodgers.

Main character timeline
For the first three seasons, the show's ensemble cast included Alan Alda as surgeon Captain Benjamin Franklin "Hawkeye" Pierce, Wayne Rogers as surgeon Captain Trapper John McIntyre, McLean Stevenson as company commander Lt. Colonel Henry Blake, Loretta Swit as head nurse Major Margaret "Hot Lips" Houlihan, Larry Linville as surgeon Major Frank Burns, Gary Burghoff as company clerk Corporal Walter Eugene "Radar" O'Reilly, Jamie Farr as combat medic Corporal Maxwell Klinger, and William Christopher as chaplain 1st Lieutenant Father John Patrick Francis Mulcahy. At the end of the third season, Rogers and Stevenson left the show, with their characters written out, and they were replaced by Mike Farrell as surgeon Captain B. J. Hunnicutt and Harry Morgan as surgeon Colonel Sherman T. Potter as the new commanding officer. After season five, Linville left to be replaced by David Ogden Stiers as surgeon Major Charles Emerson Winchester III. Early in season eight, Burghoff left the show; Klinger (Farr) was moved to company clerk to replace Radar, while G. W. Bailey joined the cast to play Staff Sergeant Luther Rizzo, the unit's motor pool sergeant. Other long-serving actors on the show include Kellye Nakahara as Nurse Kellye, Jeff Maxwell as Private Igor Straminsky, Johnny Haymer as Sergeant Zelmo Zale, the supply sergeant, Allan Arbus as psychiatrist Major Sidney Freedman, and Edward Winter as intelligence officer Colonel Sam Flagg.

Production

Writing
As the series progressed, it made a significant shift from being primarily a comedy with dramatic undertones to a drama with comedic overtones. This was a result of changes in writing and production staff. Series co-creator and comedy writer Larry Gelbart departed after Season 4. Executive Producer Gene Reynolds departed at the conclusion of Season 5 in 1977, resulting in M*A*S*H being almost fully stripped of its original comedic foundation by the beginning of Season 6.

Whereas Gelbart and Reynolds were the comedic voice of M*A*S*H for the show's first five seasons (1972–1977), Alan Alda and newly promoted Executive Producer Burt Metcalfe became the new dramatic voice of M*A*S*H for Seasons 6–11. By the start of Season 8 (1979–1980), the writing staff had been completely overhauled, and with the departure of cast members McLean Stevenson, Larry Linville, Wayne Rogers and Gary Burghoff, M*A*S*H displayed a distinctively different feel, consciously moving between comedy and drama.

The end of the Vietnam War in 1975 was a significant factor as to why storylines become less political in nature and more character driven. Several episodes experimented by going outside the sitcom format:
 "Point of View" – shown from the perspective of a soldier with a throat wound
 "Dreams" – an idea of Alda's, where during a deluge of casualties, members of the 4077 take naps on a rotation basis, allowing the viewer to see the simultaneously lyrical and disturbing dreams
 "A War For All Seasons" – features a story line that takes place over the course of 1951
 "Life Time" – utilizes a real time method of narration

Another change was the infusion of story lines based on actual events and medical developments that materialized during the Korean War. Considerable research was done by the producers, including interviews with actual MASH surgeons and personnel to develop story lines rooted in the war itself. Such early 1950s events as the McCarthy era, various sporting events, and the stardom of Marilyn Monroe were all incorporated into various episodes, a trend that continued until the end of the series.

While the series remained popular through these changes, it eventually began to run out of creative steam. Korean War doctors regularly contacted producers with experiences that they thought might make for a good storyline, only to learn the idea had previously been used. Harry Morgan admitted that he felt "the cracks were starting to show" by season 9 (1980–1981). Alda wished to make season 10 (1981–1982) M*A*S*Hs last, but was persuaded by CBS to produce a slightly shortened 11th season, coupled with a farewell movie finale, at CBS' request. In the end, season 11 had 15 episodes (although six had been filmed during season 10 and held over) and a -hour movie, which was treated as five episodes and was filmed before the nine remaining episodes. The final episode produced was the penultimately aired episode "As Time Goes By". The series finale movie, titled "Goodbye, Farewell and Amen", became the most watched U.S. television broadcast in history at that time, with 106 million viewers.

Set and filming

The 4077th consisted of two separate sets. An outdoor set in the mountains near Malibu (Calabasas, Los Angeles County, California) was used for most exterior and tent scenes for every season. This was the same location used to shoot the movie, although the number of tents was reduced and there were changes made to the positions of several tents for the TV show. The indoor set, on Stage 09 at Fox Studios in Century City, was used for the indoor scenes for the run of the series. Later, after the indoor set was renovated to permit many of the "outdoor" scenes to be filmed there, both sets were used for exterior shooting as script requirements dictated (e.g., night scenes were far easier to film on the sound stage, but scenes at the helicopter pad required using the ranch).

Just as the series was wrapping production, a brush fire destroyed most of the outdoor set on October 9, 1982. The fire was written into the final episode "Goodbye, Farewell and Amen" as a forest fire caused by enemy incendiary bombs that forced the 4077th to move out.

The Malibu location is today known as Malibu Creek State Park. Formerly called the Century Ranch and owned by 20th Century Fox Studios until the 1980s, the site today is returning to a natural state, and is marked by a rusted Jeep and a Dodge ambulance used in the show. Through the 1990s, the area was occasionally used for television commercial production.

On February 23, 2008, series stars Mike Farrell, Loretta Swit and William Christopher (along with producers Gene Reynolds and Burt Metcalfe and M*A*S*H director Charles S. Dubin) reunited at the set to celebrate its partial restoration. The rebuilt signpost is now displayed on weekends, along with tent markers and maps and photos of the set. The state park is open to the public. It was also the location where the film How Green Was My Valley (1941) and the Planet of the Apes television series (1974) were filmed, among many other productions. Much of this location, including the signpost and markers, was thought to have been destroyed in the 2018 Woolsey Fire but subsequently was determined to have survived the fire.

The exhibit M*A*S*H: Binding Up the Wounds was at the National Museum of American History from July 30, 1983, through February 3, 1985. The exhibit was extremely popular, drawing more than 17,000 in a single week, a record for any Smithsonian display.

On exhibit were The Swamp and Operating Room sets, one of the show's 14 Emmy Awards, early drafts of the pilot script, costumes from the show and other memorabilia. Sets were decorated with props from the show including the iconic signpost, Hawkeye's still and Major Winchester's Webcor tape recorder and phonograph. The exhibit also encouraged visitors to compare the show to real Mobile Army Surgical Hospitals of the Korean and the Vietnam Wars.

Laugh track
Series creators Larry Gelbart and Gene Reynolds wanted M*A*S*H broadcast without a laugh track. Though CBS initially rejected the idea, a compromise was reached that allowed for omitting the laughter during operating room scenes if desired. "We told the network that under no circumstances would we ever can laughter during an OR scene when the doctors were working," said Gelbart in 1998. "It's hard to imagine that 300 people were in there laughing at somebody's guts being sewn up."

Seasons 1–5 utilized a more invasive laugh track; a more subdued audience was employed for Seasons 6–11 when the series shifted from sitcom to comedy drama with the departure of Gelbart and Reynolds. Several episodes ("O.R.", "The Bus", "Quo Vadis, Captain Chandler?", "The Interview", "Point of View", and "Dreams" among them) omitted the laugh track altogether; as did almost all of Season 11, including the 135-minute series finale, "Goodbye, Farewell and Amen". The laugh track is also omitted from some international and syndicated airings of the show; on one occasion during an airing on BBC2, the laugh track was accidentally left on, and viewers expressed their displeasure, an apology from the network for the "technical difficulty" was later released, as during its original run on BBC2 in the UK, it was shown without the laugh track. UK DVD critics speak poorly of the laugh track, stating "canned laughter is intrusive at the best of times, but with a programme like M*A*S*H, it's downright unbearable."

On all released DVDs, both in Region 1 (including the US and Canada) and Region 2 (Europe, including the UK), an option is given to watch the show with or without the laugh track.

"They're a lie," said Gelbart in a 1992 interview. "You're telling an engineer when to push a button to produce a laugh from people who don't exist. It's just so dishonest. The biggest shows when we were on the air were All in the Family and The Mary Tyler Moore Show both of which were taped before a live studio audience where laughter made sense," continued Gelbart. "But our show was a film show – supposedly shot in the middle of Korea. So the question I always asked the network was, 'Who are these laughing people? Where did they come from?'" Gelbart persuaded CBS to test the show in private screenings with and without the laugh track. The results showed no measurable difference in the audience's enjoyment. "So you know what they said?" Gelbart said. Since there's no difference, let's leave it alone!' The people who defend laugh tracks have no sense of humor." Gelbart summed up the situation by saying, "I always thought it cheapened the show. The network got their way. They were paying for dinner."

Content
M*A*S*H was one of the first network series to feature brief partial nudity (notably Gary Burghoff's buttocks in "The Sniper", Hawkeye in "Dear Dad Again" and "An Eye for a Tooth").

In his blog, writer Ken Levine revealed that on one occasion, when the cast offered too many nitpicking "notes" on a script, his writing partner and he changed the script to a "cold show" – one set during the frigid Korean winter. The cast then had to stand around barrel fires in parkas at the Malibu ranch when the temperatures neared . Levine says, "This happened maybe twice, and we never got a ticky-tack note again."

Jackie Cooper wrote that Alan Aldawhom Cooper directed in several episodes during the first two seasonsconcealed what Cooper felt was a lot of hostility toward him, and the two barely spoke to each other by the time Cooper's tenure on the show ended.

Episodes

Episode list

Final episode: "Goodbye, Farewell and Amen"

"Goodbye, Farewell and Amen" was the final episode of M*A*S*H. Special television sets were placed in PX parking lots, auditoriums and day rooms of the U.S. Army in Korea so that military personnel could watch that episode, in spite of 14 hours' time-zone difference with the East Coast of the US. The episode aired on February 28, 1983, and was 2 hours long. The episode got a Nielsen rating of 60.2 and 77 share and according to a New York Times article from 1983, the final episode of M*A*S*H had 125 million viewers.

When the M*A*S*H finale aired in 1983, more than 83.3 million homes in the United States had televisions, compared to almost 115 million in February 2010.

"Goodbye, Farewell and Amen" broke the record for the highest percentage of homes with television sets to watch a television series. Stories persist that the episode was seen by so many people that the New York City Sanitation/Public Works Department reported the plumbing systems broke down in some parts of the city from so many New Yorkers waiting until the end to use the toilet. Articles copied into Alan Alda's book The Last Days of M*A*S*H include interviews with New York City Sanitation workers citing the spike in water use on that night. According to the interviews at 11:03 pm, EST New York City public works noted the highest water usage at one given time in the city's history. They attributed this to the fact that in the three minutes after the finale ended, around 77 percent of the people of New York City flushed their toilets. These stories have all since been identified as part of an urban legend dating back to the days of the Amos and Andy radio program in the 1930s.

Reception

Ratings and recognition
The series premiered in the US on September 17, 1972, and ended on February 28, 1983, with the finale, showcased as a television film, titled "Goodbye, Farewell and Amen", becoming the most-watched and highest-rated single television episode in US television history at the time, with a record-breaking 125 million viewers (60.2 rating and 77 share), according to the New York Times. It had struggled in its first season and was at risk of being cancelled. In season two, M*A*S*H was placed in a better time slot by CBS (airing after the popular All in the Family, taking the place of Bridget Loves Bernie, which had been canceled after one season despite good ratings due to religious groups protesting the show's premise of an inter-faith marriage between the title characters); the show then became one of the top 10 programs of the year and stayed in the top 20 programs for the rest of its run. It is still broadcast in syndication on various television stations. The series, which depicted events occurring during a three-year war, spanned 256 episodes and lasted 11 seasons. The Korean War lasted 1,128 days, meaning each episode of the series would have averaged almost four and a half days of real time. Many of the stories in the early seasons are based on tales told by real MASH surgeons who were interviewed by the production team. Like the movie, the series was as much an allegory about the Vietnam War (still in progress when the show began) as it was about the Korean War.

The episodes "Abyssinia, Henry" and "The Interview" were ranked number 20 and number 80, respectively, on TV Guide's 100 Greatest Episodes of All Time in 1997. In 2002, M*A*S*H was ranked number 25 on TV Guide's 50 Greatest TV Shows of All Time. In February 2008, the series was named the number-one smartest TV show of all time by Jim Werdell, chairman of Mensa International, who said that it "had smart repartee and was so much more than a comedy". In 2013, the Writers Guild of America ranked it as the fifth-best written TV series ever and TV Guide ranked it as the eighth-greatest show of all time. In 2016, Rolling Stone ranked it as the 16th-greatest TV show.

Season ratings

Awards

M*A*S*H was nominated for over 100 Emmy Awards during its 11-year run, winning 14:
 1974 – Outstanding Comedy Series – M*A*S*H; Larry Gelbart, Gene Reynolds (Producers)
 1974 – Best Lead Actor in a Comedy Series – Alan Alda
 1974 – Best Directing in Comedy – Jackie Cooper: "Carry On, Hawkeye"
 1974 – Actor of the Year, Series – Alan Alda
 1975 – Outstanding Directing in a Comedy Series – Gene Reynolds: "O.R."
 1976 – Outstanding Film Editing for Entertainment Programming – Fred W. Berger and Stanford Tischler: "Welcome to Korea"
 1976 – Outstanding Directing in a Comedy Series – Gene Reynolds: "Welcome to Korea"
 1977 – Outstanding Directing in a Comedy Series – Alan Alda: "Dear Sigmund"
 1977 – Outstanding Supporting Actor in a Comedy Series – Gary Burghoff
 1979 – Outstanding Writing in a Comedy-Variety or Music Series – Alan Alda: "Inga"
 1980 – Outstanding Supporting Actress in a Comedy or Variety or Music Series – Loretta Swit
 1980 – Outstanding Supporting Actor in a Comedy or Variety or Music Series – Harry Morgan
 1982 – Outstanding Lead Actor in a Comedy Series – Alan Alda
 1982 – Outstanding Supporting Actress in a Comedy or Variety or Music Series – Loretta Swit

The show won the Golden Globe Award for Best Television Series (Musical or Comedy) in 1981. Alan Alda won the Golden Globe for Best Actor in a Television Series (Musical or Comedy) six times: in 1975, 1976, 1980, 1981, 1982, and 1983. McLean Stevenson won the award for Best Supporting Actor in a Television Series in 1974.

The series earned the Directors Guild of America Award for Outstanding Directorial Achievement in a Comedy Series seven times: 1973 (Gene Reynolds), 1974 (Reynolds), 1975 (Hy Averback), 1976 (Averback), 1977 (Alan Alda), 1982 (Alda), 1983 (Alda).

The show was honored with a Peabody Award in 1975 "for the depth of its humor and the manner in which comedy is used to lift the spirit and, as well, to offer a profound statement on the nature of war." M*A*S*H was cited as "an example of television of high purpose that reveals in universal terms a time and place with such affecting clarity."

Writers for the show received several Humanitas Prize nominations, with Larry Gelbart winning in 1976, Alan Alda winning in 1980, and the team of David Pollock and Elias Davis winning twice in 1982 and 1983.

The series received 28 Writers Guild of America Award nominations – 26 for Episodic Comedy and two for Episodic Drama. Seven episodes won for Episodic Comedy in 1973, 1975, 1976, 1977, 1979, 1980, and 1981.

Other media
20th Century Fox Home Entertainment has released all 11 seasons of M*A*S*H on DVD in Region 1 and Region 2.

In January 2015, it was announced that the first five seasons of M*A*S*H would be available on Netflix's instant streaming service beginning February 1, 2015. This marked the first time the series was made available on an internet platform. As of July 1, 2015, all 11 seasons were available; syndicated versions of hour-long episodes were utilized for streaming, splitting these shows into two parts. In contrast to the DVD sets, the Netflix streams did not have an option for disabling the laugh track on the soundtrack. On April 1, 2016, Netflix' contract to stream the series expired and M*A*S*H was removed from the platform.

In July 2017, it was announced that Hulu had acquired online streaming rights for the entire run of M*A*S*H, along with several other 20th Century Fox-owned TV programs. All 256 episodes were added to Hulu beginning June 29, 2018. All episodes were scanned in 1080 HD from the original 35mm negatives and are presented in 16:9 widescreen by cropping the top and bottom off the original 4:3 aspect ratio. All the episodes are also available on Disney+.

Spin-offs and reunion specials

The two-season spin-off AfterMASH (1983–1985) inherited the parent show's Monday night time slot and featured several of its main characters reunited in a Midwestern hospital after the war. The more successful Trapper John, M.D. (1979–1986) took place nearly three decades after the events of M*A*S*H and depicted Trapper John McIntyre as chief of surgery at a San Francisco hospital; its producers argued successfully in court that it was based on the earlier movie rather than the TV series. In an unpurchased television pilot, W*A*L*T*E*R (1984), Walter "Radar" O'Reilly joins the St. Louis police force after his farm fails following his return to the U.S.

Making M*A*S*H, a documentary special narrated by Mary Tyler Moore that takes viewers behind the production of the season 8 episodes "Old Soldiers" and "Lend a Hand", was produced for PBS airing on January 21, 
1981. The special was later included in the syndicated rerun package, with new narration by producer Michael Hirsch.

Three retrospective specials were produced to commemorate the show's 20th, 30th and 50th anniversaries:
 Memories of M*A*S*H, hosted by Shelley Long and featuring clips from the series and interviews with cast members, was aired by CBS on November 25, 1991.
 M*A*S*H: 30th Anniversary Reunion, in which the surviving cast members and producers gathered to reminisce, aired on Fox on May 17, 2002. The two-hour broadcast was hosted by Mike Farrell, who also got to interact with the actor he replaced, Wayne Rogers; previously filmed interviews with McLean Stevenson and Larry Linville (who had died in 1996 and 2000, respectively,) were also featured.
 M*A*S*H: When Television Changed Forever, a one-hour retrospective commemorating the show's 50th anniversary, aired on Reelz on September 13, 2022. It featured new exclusive interviews with cast members Jamie Farr, Mike Farrell and Jeff Maxwell, as well as producers and writers, exploring the series’ popularity and creative firsts.

Memories of M*A*S*H and M*A*S*H: 30th Anniversary Reunion are included as bonuses on the Collector's Edition DVD of "Goodbye, Farewell, and Amen". Also included is "M*A*S*H: Television's Serious Sitcom," a 2002 episode of A&E channel's Biography program that detailed the show's history.

In the late 1980s, the cast had a partial reunion in a series of commercials for IBM products, including personal computers and the AS/400 system. All of the front-billed regulars (with the exceptions of Farrell and Stevenson) appeared in the spots over time.

See also

References
Informational notes

Citations

Further reading
 Gelbart, Larry. (1998). Laughing Matters: On Writing M*A*S*H, Tootsie, Oh, God! and a Few Other Funny Things. New York: Random House. .
 Kalter, Suzy. (1985). The Complete Book of M*A*S*H. New York: Harry N. Abrams. .
 Reiss, David S. (1983). M*A*S*H: The Exclusive, Inside Story of TV's Most Popular Show (2nd ed.). New York: MacMillan. .
 Solomonson, Ed, and Mark O'Neill. (2009). TV's M*A*S*H: The Ultimate Guide Book. Albany, GA: BearManor Media. .
 Wittebols, James. (1998). Watching M*A*S*H, Watching America: A Social History of the 1972–1983 Television Series. Jefferson, NC: McFarland & Co. .

External links

 
 
 M*A*S*H in the Museum of Broadcast Communications
 Google Maps view of the camp

TV series
Korean War television series
1972 American television series debuts
1983 American television series endings
1970s American sitcoms
1980s American sitcoms
1970s American comedy-drama television series
1980s American comedy-drama television series
1970s American medical television series
1980s American medical television series
American black comedy television shows
Best Musical or Comedy Series Golden Globe winners
CBS original programming
Cross-dressing in television
English-language television shows
Live action television shows based on films
Military comedy television series
Nielsen ratings winners
Peabody Award-winning television programs
Primetime Emmy Award for Outstanding Comedy Series winners
Television shows based on American novels
Television series based on adaptations
Television series by 20th Century Fox Television
Television series set in the 1950s
Television shows filmed in California
Television shows set in South Korea
M*A*S*H TV series
Works about the Korean War
Works set in hospitals